Cardiff Central is a borough constituency in the city of Cardiff. It returns one Member of Parliament (MP) to the House of Commons of the Parliament of the United Kingdom, elected by the first past the post system. The seat is currently held by Jo Stevens of the Labour Party. She was appointed as Shadow Secretary of State for Digital, Culture, Media and Sport on 6 April 2020.

Boundaries

1918–1950: The County Borough of Cardiff wards of Canton, Cathays, Central, and Riverside.

1983–2010: The City of Cardiff wards of Adamsdown, Cathays, Cyncoed, Pentwyn, Plasnewydd, and Roath.

2010–present: The Cardiff electoral divisions of Adamsdown, Cathays, Cyncoed, Pentwyn, Penylan, and Plasnewydd.

As its name suggests, Cardiff Central covers the central area of the City of Cardiff. It extends from the area around the Millennium Stadium in the south to Llanishen Golf Course in the north, taking in the City Centre and the University.

History
This was a Conservative-held three-way marginal constituency throughout the 1980s but since 1997 Labour and the Liberal Democrats have pushed the Conservative candidate into third place. The Liberal Democrats won the equivalent Welsh Assembly seat in 1999 and 2003 and also dominate the wards which make up the seat in elections to Cardiff Council.

The constituency is socially diverse, with both very affluent and very deprived areas. It has a large student population which seems to have helped Labour to win in 1992 and 1997 but thereafter increasingly switched to the Liberal Democrats due to opposition to government plans for reforming student support. This switched yet again in the 2015 general election where students were disillusioned by the broken promises the Liberal Democrats made regarding tuition fees. This was despite the fact that these student loan promises did not apply to Wales, which has a different funding system and MP Jenny Willott had also voted against the English changes in Parliament.

The seat was unchanged in the Fifth Periodical Report of the Parliamentary Boundary Commission for Wales, which took effect at the 2010 general election.

Since the seat's re-creation in 1983, it has been held successively by each of the three main political parties; the Liberal Democrats gained it at the 2005 election after 13 years of Labour representation. The constituency has transformed dramatically from being a Conservative seat for some years, to a Labour–Lib Dem marginal to the safest Labour seat in Wales today.

Members of Parliament

MPs 1918–1950

MPs since 1983

Elections

Elections 1918–1945

Elections in the 1910s

 coupon issued but withdrawn.

Elections in the 1920s

Elections in the 1930s

Elections in the 1940s
General election 1939–40:
Another general election was required to take place before the end of 1940. The political parties had been making preparations for an election to take place from 1939 and by the end of this year, the following candidates had been selected; 
National Labour: Ernest Bennett 
Labour: John Ramage

Elections 1983 to current

Elections in the 1980s

Elections in the 1990s

Elections in the 2000s

Elections in the 2010s

Of the 117 rejected ballots:
81 were either unmarked or it was uncertain who the vote was for.
32 voted for more than one candidate.
4 had writing or a mark by which the voter could be identified.

Of the 80 rejected ballots:
59 were either unmarked or it was uncertain who the vote was for.
19 voted for more than one candidate.
2 had writing or a mark by which the voter could be identified.

Of the 204 rejected ballots:
166 were either unmarked or it was uncertain who the vote was for.
38 voted for more than one candidate.

See also
 Cardiff Central (Senedd constituency)
 List of parliamentary constituencies in South Glamorgan
 List of parliamentary constituencies in Wales

Notes

References

External links
nomis Constituency Profile for Cardiff Central – presenting data from the ONS annual population survey and other official statistics.
Politics Resources (Election results from 1922 onwards)
Electoral Calculus (Election results from 1955 onwards)
2017 Election House Of Commons Library 2017 Election report
A Vision Of Britain Through Time (Constituency elector numbers)
BBC Vote 2001
BBC Election 2005
UK Constituency Maps

Politics of Cardiff
Parliamentary constituencies in South Wales
Constituencies of the Parliament of the United Kingdom established in 1918
Constituencies of the Parliament of the United Kingdom disestablished in 1950